Old Monk is a 2022 Indian Kannada-language romantic comedy film written and directed by MG Srinivas.  The film features MG Srinivas, Aditi Prabhudeva in lead role. The film's title was inspired from the popular alcohol beverage brand, but it also means "Hale Sanyasi" in Kannada. Veteran actor Rajesh, made a special cameo appearance in the film. The film was released on February 25, 2022 simultaneously in the Kannada and Telugu languages.

Critics praised the direction, comedy, writing, dialogue and performance of the film. Music Director duo Saurabh and Vaibhav collaborate a second time with Srini after Birbal, and are one of the producers of the movie.

Premise
Narada is cursed and banished to earth by Lord Krishna after he creates a quarrel between Krishna and Rukmini. The only way he can redeem himself is by getting married to someone he loves on the earth. Now, Narada, christened as Appanna, is born into a family that only believes in arranged marriage and he has no chance of finding love with his father playing the villain. When he does find an interest, there are many hurdles.

Cast
 MG Srinivas as Appanna and Narada
 Aditi Prabhudeva as Abhigna  
 S. Narayan as Narayan, Appanna's father
 Sujay Shastry as Ranveer Singh
 Sudev Nair as Shashank Radhakrishna
 Aruna Balraj as Aruna, Appanna's mother 
 Sihi Kahi Chandru	as Abhigna's father 
 Ashok Hegde as Radhakrishna, ex-minister 	
 Bangalore Nagesh	 
 Kalathapasvi Rajesh LIC Shyama Raya Guest appearance 	
 Sunil Raoh as Krishna, extended cameo appearance
 Meghasri as Rukmini
 PD Satish Chandra

Soundtrack

All songs were composed by Saurabh Vaibhav, and released under the label of Anand Audio. In "Old is Goldu", a song penned and sung by Gubbi, a tribute was paid to famous cult movies, through a photoshopped poster.

Track list

Release
The film's release was postponed several times due the COVID-19 pandemic.

Director Srini announced the new release date for the film based on the government's decisions on post-pandamic occupation, and to avoid the release dates of other films. The film was released on 25 February 2022 simultaneously in the Kannada and Telugu languages.

References

External links
 

2020s Kannada-language films
2022 films
2022 romantic comedy films
Films shot in Karnataka
Indian romantic comedy films